The 2014 Open de Guadeloupe was a professional tennis tournament played on hard courts. It was the fourth edition of the tournament which was part of the 2014 ATP Challenger Tour. It took place in Le Gosier, Guadeloupe between 31 March and 6 April 2014.

Singles main-draw entrants

Seeds

Other entrants
The following players received wildcards into the singles main draw:
  Constant Lestienne
  Rudy Coco

The following players received entry from the qualifying draw:
  Elie Rousset
  Mateo Nicolás Martínez 	
  Michael Venus
  Claudio Grassi

Doubles main-draw entrants

Seeds

Other entrants
The following pairs received wildcards into the doubles main draw:
 Rudy Coco /  Gianni Mina
 Tristan Meraut /  Elie Rousset
 Sander Groen /  Constant Lestienne

Champions

Singles 

  Steve Johnson def.  Kenny de Schepper, 6–1, 6–7(5–7), 7–6(7–2)

Doubles 

 Tomasz Bednarek /  Adil Shamasdin def.  Gero Kretschmer /  Michael Venus, 7–5, 6–7(5–7), [10–8]

External links
Official Website

Open Guadeloupe
Open de Guadeloupe
Open Guadeloupe
Open Guadeloupe
2014 in French tennis
2014 in Guadeloupean sport